Benjamin Franklin Junkin (November 12, 1822 – October 9, 1908) was a Republican  United States Representative from Pennsylvania.

Biography
Benjamin F. Junkin was born near Carlisle, Pennsylvania.  He graduated from Lafayette College in Easton, Pennsylvania.  He studied law, was admitted to the bar in 1844 and commenced practice in New Bloomfield, Pennsylvania.  He served as district attorney for Perry County, Pennsylvania, from 1850 to 1853.

Junkin was elected as a Republican to the Thirty-sixth Congress.  He was an unsuccessful candidate for reelection in 1860.  He resumed the practice of his profession in New Bloomfield.  He served as president judge of the ninth judicial district from 1871 to 1881.  He was solicitor of the Pennsylvania Railroad Company from 1886 until his death in New Bloomfield in 1908.  Interment in New Bloomfield Cemetery.

Sources

The Political Graveyard

1822 births
1908 deaths
Pennsylvania lawyers
Pennsylvania state court judges
People from Carlisle, Pennsylvania
Lafayette College alumni
Republican Party members of the United States House of Representatives from Pennsylvania
19th-century American politicians
19th-century American judges